Sir David John Holgate (born 3 August 1956), styled The Hon. Mr Justice Holgate, is a judge of the High Court of England and Wales.

Holgate was educated at Davenant Foundation Grammar School and Exeter College, Oxford. He was called to the bar by the Middle Temple in 1978 and took silk in 1997. He served as Recorder from 2002 to 2014 and Deputy High Court Judge from 2008 to 2014.

On 1 December 2014, Holgate was appointed to be a Justice of the High Court and assigned to the Queen’s Bench Division, on the retirement of Mr Justice Ramsey, receiving the customary knighthood the following year. He has been President of the Upper Tribunal Lands Chamber since 2016 and Planning Liaison Judge since 2017.

References 

1956 births
Living people
Alumni of Exeter College, Oxford
Members of the Middle Temple
Queen's Bench Division judges
English barristers
Knights Bachelor